The Network of Universities of Science and Technology of the Countries of Africa south of the Sahara or RUSTA is a network of private institutions of higher education and research whose headquarters is located in Abidjan, the economic capital of Côte d'Ivoire.

History

Founded in 2009, the RUSTA consists of universities and institutes of higher education located in sub-Saharan Africa who have come together to pool their capacities for teaching and scientific research.

The board of the RUSTA is currently chaired by Frederic Dohou.

Missions

The RUSTA tasks:

 Promote academic and scientific excellence by building a common policy on university education and scientific research,
 Make available to member institutions of financial, human and material resources for their development,
 Train future leaders of institutions and organizations capable of meeting the challenges socio-economic of the African continent,
 Promote international cooperation.

Members
The RUSTA consists of institutions located in West Africa, including: 
 Higher Institute of Technology of Ivory Coast (IST-CI)
 University of Science and Technology of Ivory Coast (UST-CI)
 University of Science and Technology of Togo (UST-TG)
 University of Science and Technology of Benin (USTB)
 International Center for Distance Learning (CIFAD)
 Consortium for the Management of Basic and Applied Research in Africa south of the Sahara (COMREFAS)
 Regional incubator for West Africa (IRAO)
 Etc.

External links
 Official website

References 

College and university associations and consortia in Africa
Educational institutions established in 2009
2009 establishments in Ivory Coast